Fernando Wagner (November 7, 1905 in Göttingen, Germany – October 20, 1973 in Cuernavaca, Mexico) was a German-born Mexican actor and film director. He had prominent roles in La Perla and The Wild Bunch. His interment was in Mexico City's Panteón Jardín.

Partial filmography

La familia Dressel (1935) - Invitado alemán
Symphony of Life (1946)
La Perla (1947) - Dealer 1
Adventures of Casanova (1948) - Assassinated Commander (uncredited)
Tarzan and the Mermaids (1948) - Varga - Pearl Trader
Sofia (1948) - Dr. Erik Viertel
My Outlaw Brother (1951) - Burger
Del can-can al mambo (1951) - Embajador de Austria-Hungria (uncredited)
Un príncipe de la iglesia (1952)
El Monstruo resucitado (1953) - Gherásimos
The Player (1953) - Esposo de Yolanda
The Photographer (1953) - Jefe de villanos
 The Price of Living (1954)
 Garden of Evil (1954) - Steamboat Captain (uncredited)
La Bruja (1954) - Jan
De ranchero a empresario (1954)
Seven Cities of Gold (1955) - Blacksmith (uncredited)
Sierra Baron (1958) - Grandall
Virgin Sacrifice (1959) - Fernando
The Empty Star (1960)
Cuando ¡Viva Villa..! es la muerte (1960) - Cain Pianni
Rosa Blanca (1961) - Von Allpenstock
Cri Cri el grillito cantor (1963) - Editor
Una cara para escapar (1963)
Viva Maria! (1965) - Father of Maria II
El derecho de nacer (1966) - Dr. Steiner
Su Excelencia (1967) - Representante de Salchichonia
La vuelta del Mexicano (1967)
The Wild Bunch (1969) - Commander Mohr
Los corrompidos (1971) - Williams
El cielo y tu (1971) - Sr. Khoner
Santo en Anónimo mortal (1975) - Old Nazi (final film role)

External links
 
 
 Fernando Wagner and Theater in Mexico (Spanish)
 Tribute to Fernando Wagner (Spanish)
 Theater Insight: Fernando Wagner (Spanish)

1905 births
1973 deaths
Mexican male actors
German emigrants to Mexico
20th-century Mexican male actors